Retimohnia glypta is a species of sea snail, a marine gastropod mollusk in the family Retimohniidae, the true whelks and the like.

Description
The shell grows to a length of 27 mm

Distribution
This species is distributed in European waters (Iceland, Greenland, Faroes) and in the Northwest Atlantic Ocean (New Jersey)

References

 Gofas, S.; Le Renard, J.; Bouchet, P. (2001). Mollusca, in: Costello, M.J. et al. (Ed.) (2001). European register of marine species: a check-list of the marine species in Europe and a bibliography of guides to their identification. Collection Patrimoines Naturels, 50: pp. 180–213
 Bouchet P. & Warén A. (1985). Revision of the Northeast Atlantic bathyal and abyssal Neogastropoda excluding Turridae (Mollusca, Gastropoda). Bollettino Malacologico Suppl. 1: 121–296

External links

Retimohniidae
Gastropods described in 1882